Poles of Croatia are one of 22 national minorities in Croatia. According to the 2011 Census, there were 672 Poles living in Croatia, of which most lived in Zagreb.

Croatian Poles have established two cultural societies, the Polish Cultural Association "Mikolaj Kopernik" that also includes the vocal and dance ensembles in Zagreb and the Polish Cultural Association "Fryderyk Chopin" in Rijeka.

Historical numbers

Notable people of Polish ancestry in Croatia 
  (1868,  (now part of Kamanje)  1949, Zagreb) (paternally Polish)
 Adolf Mošinsky
 Slavoljub Penkala (paternally Polish)
  (born 1945, Sinj; grandfather was Polish)
 Vanda Kochansky-Devidé (ancestors was Polish)
  (1924, Białystok  2010, Zagreb), literary scholar
 Fostač family
 Benedikt Fostač
 Antun Fostač
 Verena (Janja) Fostač
 Ignacije Fostač

See also  
 Croatia–Poland relations

References 

 
 
Ethnic groups in Croatia
Polish minorities